Puczniew-Leonów  is a village in the administrative district of Gmina Lutomiersk, within Pabianice County, Łódź Voivodeship, in central Poland.

The village has a population of 50.

References

this is a place

Villages in Pabianice County